Prisca Emeafu  (born 30 March 1972) is a Nigerian footballer who played as a defender for the Nigeria women's national football team. She was part of the team at the 1995 FIFA Women's World Cup and 1999 FIFA Women's World Cup.

References

External links
 

1972 births
Living people
Nigerian women's footballers
Nigeria women's international footballers
Place of birth missing (living people)
1995 FIFA Women's World Cup players
1999 FIFA Women's World Cup players
Women's association football defenders